Avner Ben-Gal (born 1966) is an international painter and artist, working mainly from Tel Aviv, Israel. His works depict various intense, often neglected locations such as agricultural fields, prisons and smoky interiors, whereby theatrical scenes play out. The scenes present ghostly, rough hewn and often low life figures that are bare and hardened. The parallel between Ben-Gal's raw way of painting and his tough, ambiguous subject matter allows a unique intensity within his paintings.

Avner Ben-Gal studied at Bezalel Academy of Art and Design, Jerusalem.  Ben-Gal was the subject of  solo shows at museums such as the Tel Aviv Museum of Art (2002, 2009); Museum für Gegenwartskunst, Basel, Switzerland (2008); and Sudden Poverty at the Aspen Art Museum, Colorado, United States (2007); and he has participated in various group shows, including DARK at the Museum Boijmans Van Beuningen, Rotterdam, and as part of the Venice Biennial, 2003. A number of books have been published on his work, notably a catalogue to accompany his 2008 show in Basel.

He is currently represented by Sadie Coles HQ London, Bortolami Gallery, New York, CFA Gallery, Berlin and by Tempo Rubato gallery, Tel Aviv.

Education

1993	
Cum Laude B.A. Fine Art, Bezalel Academy of Art and Design, Jerusalem

Prizes and awards
2001	
Residency program at The Elizabeth Foundation for the Arts, New York (NY), USA

1998
Minister of Education and Cultural Prize, Israel

1996
Kollner award for excellent young artists, Bezalel Academy, Jerusalem, Israel

1993 Mary Fischer award for excellent young artists, Bezalel Academy, Jerusalem, Israel

Selected solo exhibitions
2013
 The Rover, CFA Gallery, Berlin
2012	
 Sadie Coles HQ, London 
2010	
 Smackville, Bortolami, NY
2009	
 Tel Aviv Museum of Art, Israel
2008	
 Fabio Tiboni, Bologna, Italy
 Sadie Coles HQ, London
 Kunstmuseum Basel, Museum für Gegenwartskunst, Switzerland
2007	
 Aspen Art Museum, Aspen, Colorado
2006	
 Bortolami Dayan, New York
2005	
 Sadie Coles HQ, London
 Cursed By Slaves, Nouvelles Images Gallery, The Hague, Holland
2002	
 Helena, The Helena Rubinstein Pavilion of Art, Tel Aviv Museum of Art, Tel Aviv, Israel
2001	
 The Eve of Destruction, Tal Esther Gallery, Tel Aviv, Israel
1999	
 New Army, Mary Fauzi Gallery, Tel Aviv, Israel
1998	
 Curly Drugs, the Artists’ Studios Gallery, Tel Aviv, Israel
1997	
 Design, Hamidrasha Academy of Art Gallery, Beit Berl, Israel
1995	
 Avivit, the Israel Museum of Art, Jerusalem

Selected group exhibitions
2013
“La figurazione inevitabile” per l'arte contemporanea Luigi Pecci, Prato, Italy
 “Mythographies” , Yafo 23, Jerusalem
 
2012
“Accelerating Toward Apocalypse: Works from the Doron Sebbag Art Collection”, Givon Art Forum, Tel Aviv, Israel
 
2011	
“The Museum Presents Itself: Israeli Art from the Museum Collection”, Tel Aviv Museum of Art, Tel Aviv, Israel
“The Second Strike”, Hezliya Museum of Contemporary Art, Hezliya, Israel
 
2010	
 Re-Dressing, Bortolami, NY
 What Is Political, Bat - Yam Museum of art, Israel
2009	
 Directions, A Palazzo Gallery, Brescia, Italy
 History of Violence, Haifa Museum of Art, Israel
2008	
 Penal Colony, Ein Harod Museum, Israel
 SGOZZATA, Peres Projects, Berlin
 Eventually We'll Die, Young art in Israel of the Nineties, Herzliya Museum of Contemporary Art, Israel
2007	
 XXS (Extra Extra Small), Sommer Contemporary Art, Tel Aviv, Israel
2006	
 Infinite Painting: Contemporary Painting and Global Realism, Villa Manin Centre for Contemporary Art, Passariano, Codroipo (Udine), Italy
 Dark, Museum Boijmans Van Beuningen Rotterdam, Holland
 Through the looking glass, Galerie Bob van Orsouw, Zurich
2005	
 A Wonderful View, Vous Etes Ici, Amsterdam
 The New Hebrews, Martin Gropius-Bau, Berlin
2004	
 Huts, Douglas Hyde Gallery, Dublin
 Painting 2004, Victoria Miro Gallery, London
2003	
 Clandestine, the 50th International Art Exhibition of La Biennale di Venezia, Venice, Italy
2001	
 The Armory Show, Tel Aviv Museum of Art, Tel Aviv
 Israel Spunky, Exit Art, New York
2000	
 Le Repubbliche Dell’Arte; the Israeli Season, Palazzo Delle Papesse, Sienna, Italy
 Wish List: New Acquisitions, Israel Museum of Art, Jerusalem
1999	
 Ladies and Gentlemen, Tel Aviv Museum of Art, Tel Aviv, Israel
1998	
 Video Program # 3: Herzliya Museum of Contemporary Art, Herzliya, Israel
 The Lesser Light, Israel Museum of Art, Jerusalem
 Spring at the end of the summer, Tel Aviv Museum of Art, Tel Aviv, Israel
 Ministry of Education and Culture Award Exhibition, Herzilya Museum of Contemporary Art, Herzliya, Israel
1994	
 En Suite, Museum van Hedenaagse Kunst, Ghent, Belgium
 Transit, ArtFocus 1, New Central Bus Station, Tel Aviv, Israel

External links 
Kunstmuseum Basel
Sudden Poverty, Aspen Art Museum
Sadie Coles HQ
Bortolami Gallery, New York
Avner Ben-Gal at the-artists.org
Avner Ben-Gal at artfacts.net
Exhibition at Victoria-Miro

Living people
Israeli male painters
1966 births
Israeli contemporary artists